Trecia-Kaye Smith (born 5 November 1975 in Westmoreland, Jamaica) is a Jamaican athlete competing mainly in triple jump.

Career
In college, she competed for the University of Pittsburgh from 1996–1999 and was a seven-time NCAA national champion (two outdoor and three indoor long jump titles and one outdoor and one indoor triple jump title), 15-time All-American, a 14-time Big East Conference champion, and a 15-time Eastern College Athletic Conference champion. Trecia was named to the NCAA Division 1 Silver Anniversary Indoor Team and a "NCAA Division 1 Most Outstanding Student-Athlete".

Her personal best is 15.16 metres, and she almost equalled that result at the 2005 World Championships where she, in the absence of Golden League winner Tatyana Lebedeva, won the gold medal with 15.11 metres.

Smith won triple jump at the 2009 Jamaican Championship with 14.43 m, qualifying for her fifth World Championships in Athletics. She retained her Commonwealth triple jump title at the 2010 Commonwealth Games, and she was given the David Dixon Award for her performance. The decision was a surprise in many quarters as she had only one legal jump at the competition, a modest mark of 14.19 m which she herself acknowledged was "a terrible jump". Alicia Coutts, who emerged with five swimming gold medals, was among the athletes Smith was chosen ahead of.

Achievements

References

External links
 
 
 Picture of Trecia Smith

1975 births
Living people
People from Westmoreland Parish
Jamaican female triple jumpers
Athletes (track and field) at the 2004 Summer Olympics
Athletes (track and field) at the 2008 Summer Olympics
Athletes (track and field) at the 2012 Summer Olympics
Olympic athletes of Jamaica
Athletes (track and field) at the 2002 Commonwealth Games
Athletes (track and field) at the 2006 Commonwealth Games
Athletes (track and field) at the 2010 Commonwealth Games
Pittsburgh Panthers women's track and field athletes
Commonwealth Games gold medallists for Jamaica
World Athletics Championships medalists
Commonwealth Games medallists in athletics
Commonwealth Games bronze medallists for Jamaica
World Athletics Championships winners
20th-century Jamaican women
21st-century Jamaican women
Medallists at the 2010 Commonwealth Games